Tuszyn is a village within Dzierżoniów County, Lower Silesian Voivodeship, in south-western Poland. Prior to 1945 it was in Germany.

References

Tuszyn